Pradit Taweechai is a retired professional footballer from Thailand. He is credited for being the first Thailand player as well as foreign Asian player to play for Persib Bandung (2004–05). Persib later continued signing thai players, such as, Kosin Hathairattanakool, Nipont Chanarwut, and Suchao Nuchnum.

External links
Profile at Thaipremierleague.co.th

Living people
Pradit Taweechai
1979 births
Association football defenders
Pradit Taweechai
Persib Bandung players
Tampines Rovers FC players
Pradit Taweechai